Yechun Garden is a distinctive garden in Yangzhou, China. Yechun in Chinese means "girls and boys go on some outings in spring"

Brief Introduction 
Yechun Garden was built in the late Ming and early Qing Dynasty. It south faces a clear stream, and connects a low wharf in the north. There are many classic buildings such as the LakesideRetreat and Xiangying Corridor. Yechun Garden is an ideal place for drinking tea and rest with a variety of bonsai and goldfish displayed frequently.

History 
Yechun Garden used to be the Qing Dynasty poet Wang Yuyang's private garden, where he recited works with a circle of friends. After the liberation of China in 1949, the city of Yangzhou touched the scenery around Slender West Lake by establishing a garden covering Shengqing teahouse, Xiangyinglang teahouse and Yechun flower house which all lie on the banks of Slender West Lake with its original name Yechun.

Scenic spots 
Canying Villa, Wenyueshan House, Yinhui Hall, Yuxiang Flower House.

External links 
 http://www.8264.com/mudidi/whither-scape-op-detail-sn-1-3-69-0-348-16158
 http://www.lvmama.com/dest/yechunyuan

Gardens in Jiangsu
Yangzhou